Tweeter Center can refer to any of the following amphitheatres:

Tweeter Center at the Waterfront, now Freedom Mortgage Pavilion, in Camden, New Jersey, near Philadelphia
Tweeter Center Chicago, now Hollywood Casino Amphitheatre, in Tinley Park, Illinois, near Chicago
Tweeter Center for the Performing Arts, now Xfinity Center, in Mansfield, Massachusetts, near Boston